Miami is an unincorporated community in Deer Creek Township, Miami County, in the U.S. state of Indiana.

History
Miami was founded by Isaac Herrell and platted in 1849 by Isaac’s brother James. Their other brother Austin started the first Church and School in his home. James son Beecher opened the first grocery store.

 The community took its name from Miami County.

Geography

References

Unincorporated communities in Miami County, Indiana
Unincorporated communities in Indiana